Alberto Bruttomesso (born 30 October 2003) is an Italian cyclist, who currently rides for UCI Continental team .

Major results
Source:
2021
 1st Stage 2a Giro Della Lunigiana
 4th Gran Premio Eccellenze Valli del Soligo
2022
 1st Stage 1 Giro d'Italia Giovani Under 23
 6th Gran Premio della Liberazione
 7th Gran Premio di Poggiana

References

External links

2003 births
Living people
Italian male cyclists